Mont Sainte-Victoire with Large Pine is an oil on canvas painting by the French artist Paul Cézanne. It is owned by the Courtauld Institute of Art and on display in the Gallery at Somerset House. It belongs to a series of oil paintings of Mont Sainte-Victoire that Cézanne painted throughout his career.

Description
The subject of the painting is the Montagne Sainte-Victoire in Provence in southern France. Cézanne spent a lot of time in Aix-en-Provence at the time, and developed a special relationship with the landscape. This painting represented the Mont Sainte-Victoire seen from Montbriant in Aix-en-Provence.

Moreover, Cézanne depicted the railway bridge on the Aix-Marseille line at the Arc River Valley in the center on the right side of this picture.

See also
List of paintings by Paul Cézanne

References

Sources 
Tomoki Akimaru, "Cézanne and the Steam Railway (1)~(7)", (Japan, 2012).

1880s paintings
Paintings by Paul Cézanne
Paintings in the collection of the Courtauld Institute of Art